Saint-Pierre-de-Rivière (Languedocien: Sent Pèire) is a commune in the Ariège department in southwestern France.

Population

Inhabitants of Saint-Pierre-de-Rivière are called Saint-Pierrois.

See also
Communes of the Ariège department

References

Communes of Ariège (department)
Ariège communes articles needing translation from French Wikipedia